Jim Schaefer is an American journalist based in Detroit, Michigan, where he works as an investigative journalist for the Detroit Free Press.

Life and career

Schaefer graduated from Ohio State University. He was an investigative producer for WXYZ-TV.

He led an investigation into fentanyl.

With the Detroit Free Press, Schaefer was one member of a team that covered Detroit Mayor Kwame Kilpatrick, and uncovered the scandals that led to his 2008 resignation from office and criminal conviction. To break the case open, the reporters filed a Freedom of Information Act lawsuit that was heard by the Michigan Supreme Court. The Detroit Free Press staff, which notably included contributors Schaefer and M.L. Elrick, shared the 2009 Pulitzer Prize for Local Reporting, which cited the staff's "uncovering of a pattern of lies by Mayor Kwame Kilpatrick that included denial of a sexual relationship with his female chief of staff, prompting an investigation of perjury that eventually led to jail terms for the two officials."

Awards
 2009 Pulitzer Prize for Journalism
 2009 1st Amendment Watchdog Award 
 2008 George Polk Award
 2008 Worth Bingham Prize for Investigative Journalism
 2008 Nancy Dickerson Whitehead Award for Excellence in Reporting on Drug and Alcohol Problems.

See also

References

External links
  (?)

American male journalists
Journalists from Michigan
Ohio State University alumni
Living people
George Polk Award recipients
Pulitzer Prize for Local Reporting winners
Detroit Free Press people
Year of birth missing (living people)
Place of birth missing (living people)